Silversands (published by Pendragon Press) is a science fiction novel by British writer Gareth L. Powell. It was his debut novel.

Plot summary
In an age where interstellar travel is dangerous and unpredictable, and no-one knows exactly where a trip ends up, Avril Bradley is a Communications officer on board a ship sent to re-contact as many of these lost souls as possible. But a mysterious explosion strands her in a world of political intrigue, espionage and subterfuge; a world of retired cops, digital ghosts and corporate assassins who fight for possession of computer data that had lain undisturbed for almost a century.

Ebook edition
As Silversands was only produced in a limited run in hardcover, online publisher Anarchy Books released a mass-market ebook edition in April 2012, including the bonus short story "Memory Dust".

Critical reception
The novel received mostly favorable reviews, including reviews from Interzone and Eric Brown in The Guardian. Brown regarded the novel as a "fine hi-tech romp" but was critical of what he called "a rushed and melodramatic dénouement."

References

External links
Silversands on Gareth L. Powell's website

2010 science fiction novels
2010 British novels
Space opera novels
British science fiction novels
2010 debut novels